Badsworth is a civil parish in the metropolitan borough of the City of Wakefield, West Yorkshire, England.  The parish contains ten listed buildings that are recorded in the National Heritage List for England.  Of these, one is listed at Grade I, the highest of the three grades, and the others are at Grade II, the lowest grade.  The parish contains the village of Badsworth and the surrounding area.  All the listed buildings are in the village, and include a church, and monuments and a sundial in the churchyard.  The other listed buildings consist of a farmhouse, and a former stable, a former rectory,and a former meeting room, all converted into private houses.


Key

Buildings

References

Citations

Sources

 

Lists of listed buildings in West Yorkshire